Theresetta Catholic School is a Catholic separate school in the town of Castor, Alberta, Canada.  Its principal is Rogèr Fetüs, and its patron saint is Saint Thérèse, from whom it takes its name.

History
The school was established in October 1, 1913 as Bethlehem Private School.

External links
 Theresetta Catholic School

Elementary schools in Alberta
Roman Catholic schools in Alberta
Educational institutions established in 1913